Thomas Leonard Apsey (11 February 1910 – 1967) was a Welsh professional footballer who played as a centre forward. He played two English Football League matches for Newport County.

References

1910 births
1967 deaths
People from Rhondda
Welsh footballers
Association football forwards
Newport County A.F.C. players
Burnley F.C. players
Arsenal F.C. players
English Football League players